The Harmsworth Red Magazine, also known as Harmsworth's Red Magazine or just The Red Magazine, was a fiction magazine published by Alfred Harmsworth's Amalgamated Press in 620 issues from June 1908 to September 1939. It was edited by John Stock. It had counterparts, The Yellow Magazine and The Green Magazine.

Jack London's story "Goliah" was published in the magazine in 1908 before being published in the collection of London writings Revolution, and Other Essays in 1910.

References

External links 

http://www.philsp.com/mags/red.html

Publications established in 1908
Publications disestablished in 1939